The langley (Ly) is a unit of heat transmission, especially used to express the rate of solar radiation (or insolation) received by the earth. The unit was proposed by Franz Linke in 1942 and named after Samuel Langley (1834–1906) in 1947.

Definition
One langley is 
1 thermochemical calorie per square centimetre,
41 840 J/m2 (joules per square metre)

See also 
 Solar constant
 Radiant exposure

References

Units of measurement
Non-SI metric units